John Paul the Great Academy is a private, Roman Catholic high school in Lafayette, Louisiana.  It is operated independent of the Roman Catholic Diocese of Lafayette.

Background
John Paul the Great was established in 2007.

Notes and references

External links
 School Website

Catholic secondary schools in Louisiana
Educational institutions established in 2007
Schools in Lafayette, Louisiana
2007 establishments in Louisiana